The 1960 Cork Senior Hurling Championship was the 72nd staging of the Cork Senior Hurling Championship since its establishment by the Cork County Board in 1887. The draw for the opening round fixtures took place at the Cork Convention on 31 January 1960. The championship began on 24 April 1960 and ended on 18 September 1960.

Glen Rovers entered the championship as the defending champions.

On 18 September 1960, Glen Rovers won the championship following a 3-08 to 1-12 defeat of University College Cork in the final. This was their 18th championship title overall and their third title in succession.

University College Cork's John Joe Browne was the championship's top scorer with 2-17.

Team changes

To Championship

Promoted from the Cork Intermediate Hurling Championship
 Mallow

Results

First round

Quarter-finals

Semi-finals

Final

Championship statistics

Top scorers

Top scorer overall

Top scorers in a single game

References

Cork Senior Hurling Championship
Cork Senior Hurling Championship